Georgia Avenue–Petworth is a Washington Metro station in Washington, D.C., on the Green Line and Yellow Line. It is located at the border of the neighborhoods of Petworth, Sixteenth Street Heights, and Park View in Northwest.

History
It opened on September 18, 1999, part of an extension of the Green Line that connected U Street and Fort Totten, allowing trains to travel between Anacostia and Greenbelt.

The station's west entrance closed on December 11, 2006, to accommodate construction of a mixed-use development. Bus stops, bike racks, and lockers were moved, and the entrance remained closed until 2009, a year later than planned.

Like many other Metro stations, Georgia Avenue–Petworth has catalyzed nearby development. The District of Columbia Office of Planning has divided development proposals near the station into four localities:
 Park View. Composed of three blocks along Georgia Avenue south of the station—3200 West, 3400 East, and 3500 East—Park View development is mainly limited by a  height limit to infill residential or four- to six-story mixed-use development.
 Pleasant Plains. Further south, sites at 2700 West and 2900 West on Georgia Avenue are also subject to the low height restriction but with more emphasis on apartments and row houses.
 Petworth-Metro.
 Upshur. The northernmost of the four regions, it is centered on Upshur Street near Kansas Avenue. As with Pleasant Plains, the Planning Office has focused on residential development for Upshur.

Station layout
The station has an island platform located below New Hampshire Avenue, with street-level access from the intersection with Georgia Avenue.

References

External links

 The Schumin Web Transit Center: Georgia Ave-Petworth Station
 Georgia Avenue and New Hampshire Avenue entrance from Google Maps Street View
 West side of Georgia Avenue entrance from Google Maps Street View

Stations on the Green Line (Washington Metro)
Washington Metro stations in Washington, D.C.
Stations on the Yellow Line (Washington Metro)
Railway stations in the United States opened in 1999
1991 establishments in Washington, D.C.
Petworth (Washington, D.C.)
Railway stations located underground in Washington, D.C.